Gyrodactylidae is a family of flatworms in the order Gyrodactylidea.

Genera
Acanthoplacatus Ernst, Jones & Whittington, 2001
Archigyrodactylus Mizelle & Kritsky, 1967
Citharodactylus Přikrylová, Shinn & Paladini, 2017
Fundulotrema Kritsky & Thatcher, 1977
Gyrocerviceanseris Cone, Abbott, Gilmore & Burt, 2010
Gyrodactyloides Bychowsky, 1947
Gyrodactylus von Nordmann, 1832
Isancistrum de Beauchamp, 1912
Laminiscus Palsson & Beverley-Burton, 1983
Micropolyclithrum Skinner, 1975
Paragyrodactylus Gvozdev & Matrechov, 1953
Polyclithrum Rogers, 1967
Swingleus Rogers, 1969

References

 
Platyhelminthes families